Associação Sportiva São Domingos was a Brazilian football club based in Marcehal Deodoro, Alagoas. The club last participated in the Campeonato Alagoano Segunda Divisão in the 2018 season.

They competed in the Série B once.

History
The club was founded on 1 September 1970. They won the Campeonato Alagoano Second Level in 1999, since they were the only participating team. São Domingos competed in the Série B in 1972, when they were eliminated in the First Stage of the competition.

Achievements
 Campeonato Alagoano Second Level:
 Winners (1): 1999

Stadium
Associação Sportiva São Domingos play their home games at Estádio José Cordeiro, nicknamed Cordeirão. The stadium has a maximum capacity of 2,000 people.

References

Defunct football clubs in Alagoas
Association football clubs established in 1970
Football clubs in Alagoas
1970 establishments in Brazil